Sonic the Hedgehog is a 2020 action-adventure comedy film based on the video game series published by Sega. Directed by Jeff Fowler (in his feature directorial debut) and written by Pat Casey and Josh Miller, it stars Ben Schwartz as the voice of Sonic the Hedgehog, alongside Jim Carrey and James Marsden, with supporting roles by Tika Sumpter, Natasha Rothwell, Adam Pally, Lee Majdoub and Neal McDonough. The film follows Sonic (voiced by Schwartz), a blue anthropomorphic hedgehog who can run supersonic speeds. He teams up with a town sheriff, Tom Wachowski (Marsden), to stop the mad scientist Dr. Robotnik (Carrey).

Development for a Sonic film began in the 1990s but did not leave the planning stage until Sony Pictures acquired the rights in 2013. Fowler was brought in to direct in 2016. After Sony put the project in turnaround, Paramount Pictures acquired it in 2017. Most of the cast signed on by August 2018, and principal filming took place between September and October that year in Vancouver and on Vancouver Island. Following the negative reaction to the first trailer's reveal of Sonic's appearance in April of 2019, Paramount delayed the film release by three months, taking five months to redesign Sonic in the meanwhile.

Sonic the Hedgehog premiered at the Paramount Pictures studio lot on January 25, 2020, before being theatrically released in the United States on February 14. It set the record for the biggest opening weekend for a video game film in the United States and Canada and grossed  worldwide, becoming the sixth-highest-grossing film of 2020, and was the highest-grossing video game film adaptation of all time in North America until 2022, when it was surpassed by its sequel. It received positive reviews from critics, who praised its action sequences, acting, pacing, cinematography and Sonic’s redesign, but criticized its screenplay and lack of ambition. Sonic the Hedgehog 2 was released in 2022, while Sonic the Hedgehog 3 is scheduled for 2024. A spin-off miniseries starring Knuckles is in development.

Plot
On a distant planet, Sonic, a young anthropomorphic blue hedgehog who can run at supersonic speed, is unexpectedly attacked by an echidna tribe. His guardian, an anthropomorphic owl named Longclaw, gives him a bag of warp rings that open portals to other planets. She uses one to send him to Earth while she stays behind to hold off the echidnas, leaving Sonic behind.

Ten years later, an older Sonic enjoys a secret life under the rural town of Green Hills, Montana, but longs to make friends. He idolizes the local sheriff Tom Wachowski and his wife Maddie, unaware the pair are to relocate to San Francisco as Tom plans to accept a post with the SFPD.

One night, Sonic grows upset over his loneliness while playing baseball alone and accidentally triggers an electromagnetic pulse causes a massive power outage across the Pacific Northwest while running at high speeds instead. The United States Department of Defense reluctantly enlists the services of eccentric roboticist and scientific genius Dr. Robotnik to determine the cause. Seeing he is being hunted, Sonic plots to leave Earth for a different planet; he is reluctant to do so as the planet only consists of fungi. However, Tom discovers Sonic in his shed and tranquilizes him, causing Sonic to accidentally create a portal to the Transamerica Pyramid's tower roof upon reading the writing on Tom's shirt. Sonic accidentally drops his bag of rings on the tower's roof through the warp ring before he passes out. Tom hesitantly agrees to help Sonic and the two flee when confronted by Robotnik, who falsely labels Tom a domestic terrorist. The two slowly bond, with Tom relating to Sonic's desire for friends. Sonic creates a bucket list and Tom helps him complete several entries along their journey.

Meanwhile, Robotnik, discovering that one of Sonic's quills holds an almost limitless amount of electrical energy, plans to capture Sonic to use his powers for his machines. As he tracks them down, Sonic and Tom manage to fight off several mechanized drones sent by Robotnik, but Sonic is injured in the battle.

Arriving in San Francisco, Tom brings Sonic to Maddie, who treats him at her sister Rachel's home. Sonic receives a new pair of red sneakers to replace his ruined ones from Rachel's daughter Jojo. The group heads to the roof of the tower and recovers the rings as Robotnik arrives in an advanced attack hovercraft powered by the quill, now decked in a red and pink flight suit and red flight goggles. Sonic fights off Robotnik's drones, hastily using one of his Warp Rings to send Tom and Maddie back to a Green Hills farm to protect them after pushing them off the tower; however, Robotnik uses the quill's power to match Sonic's speed. Sonic fights Robotnik in a chase across the world utilizing the Warp Rings before Robotnik subdues Sonic in Green Hills. Tom and the townsfolk intervene, and Tom acknowledges Sonic as his friend, causing Sonic to regain his power. Sonic takes back his quill's power from Robotnik, weakening Robotnik's hovercraft. Sonic also promises himself that he will always use his power to protect his friends. Using his powerful spin attack, Sonic obliterates Robotnik's hovercraft and defeats him by banishing him into a warp ring portal to the mushroom planet.

Following the incident, Tom and Maddie decide to stay in Green Hills and let Sonic live with them, treating him as a surrogate son. The government erases all evidence of the events, including records of Robotnik's existence, rewarding Tom and Maddie with an Olive Garden gift card as a small token of gratitude. Three months later, Robotnik is still in possession of Sonic's quill and usable equipment salvaged from the remains of his hovercraft, planning his return and revenge against Sonic, Tom, and Maddle.

Cast

Voice cast
 Ben Schwartz as Sonic the Hedgehog, an anthropomorphic blue hedgehog with superhuman speed from Mobius who finds himself on the run from Robotnik and the United States Government. After meeting and teaming up with Tom, Sonic resolves to use his super-speed to fight and to put to stop and prevent Robotnik from getting his hands on his super-sonic speed powers for his plans of conquering the Earth. Schwartz also provided the motion-capture for Sonic.
 Benjamin L. Valic voices Young Sonic.
 Donna J. Fulks as Longclaw, an anthropomorphic brown owl and Sonic's caregiver. 
 Colleen O'Shaughnessey as Miles "Tails" Prower, an anthropomorphic yellow-orange two-tailed fox who appears in the mid-credits scene where he emerges into Earth to find Sonic. O'Shaughnessey, who has voiced the character in the video game series since 2014, is the only voice actress to reprise the role from the video games.

Live-action cast
 Jim Carrey as Dr. Robotnik, a brilliant robotics expert and mad scientist who works with the American government, covets Sonic's abilities, and plans to exploit them for personal gain, leading him to become Sonic's archenemy. Carrey compared his character to his portrayal of the Riddler in Batman Forever, saying: "I wouldn't put one against the other. I think they'd be a great team. But you know, it's like Robotnik and every supervillain in Marvel or DC basically comes from a place of neglect with a feeling of absolute worthlessness that manifests itself in magnificent creations that are designed to control the world, put their brand on everybody, and maybe even get inside your bloodstream with some nanotechnology occasionally".
 James Marsden as Tom Wachowski, the sheriff of Green Hills, known to Sonic as "Donut Lord", who wishes to join the SFPD. He becomes a father figure to Sonic and aids him in his quest to stop Robotnik. Prior to Marsden's casting, Chris Pratt and Jason Bateman were considered for the role, with Pratt even getting to the audition stage, seen on an early teaser poster with Sonic's original design.
 Tika Sumpter as Maddie Wachowski, a veterinarian and Tom's wife, who helps him and Sonic stops Robotnik. Sonic calls her "Pretzel Lady." 
 Natasha Rothwell as Rachel, Maddie's older sister who dislikes Tom and frequently attempts to encourage Maddie to leave him.
 Adam Pally as Wade Whipple, a dimwitted deputy sheriff in Green Hills and Tom's closest loyal friend.
 Neal McDonough as Major Bennington, a soldier tasked with assisting Robotnik (whom he dislikes) in his efforts to capture Sonic.
 Lee Majdoub as Agent Stone, a government agent who works for Robotnik.
 Melody Nosipho Niemann as Jojo, Rachel's daughter and the niece of Maddie and Tom.
 Tom Butler as Commander Walters, the Vice Chairman of the Joint Chiefs of Staff who orders Robotnik to investigate the power outage caused by Sonic.
 Frank C. Turner as Crazy Carl, a conspiracy theorist who seeks to prove Sonic's existence and refers to him as the "Blue Devil".
 Elfina Luk as the Secretary of Homeland Security.
 Garry Chalk as the U.S. Navy Chief of Staff. Chalk previously voiced Grounder and Robotnik in Adventures of Sonic the Hedgehog and Sonic Underground respectively.
 Michael Hogan as the Air Force Chief of Staff.

Production

Prior efforts 
Development for a film adaptation of the Sonic the Hedgehog video games began in 1993 during production of DIC Entertainment's television show Adventures of Sonic the Hedgehog. Michealene Risley, the newly appointed consumer products director who helped license Sonic for Adventures, negotiated with several Hollywood producers. Sega of America CEO Tom Kalinske was wary of damaging the brand, citing the commercial and critical failures of the Super Mario Bros. and Street Fighter films. Despite Kalinske's concerns, Sega was enthusiastic. In August 1994, Sega struck a development deal with MGM and Trilogy Entertainment Group, with Pen Densham as executive producer.

MGM and Sega hired Richard Jefferies, an associate of Risley from her days at Marvel Comics, to write a film treatment. At the time, Sega was developing the video game Sonic X-treme (which was canceled in late 1996) for its next console, the Sega Saturn, and asked Jefferies to feature the Saturn in the screenplay. Jefferies' treatment, Sonic: Wonders of the World, was submitted in May 1995. While the draft received a positive response among MGM and Sega executives, Sega COO Shinobu Toyoda suggested Kalinske replace Robotnik with a meaner villain. MGM canceled the project after a failed attempt to revive it at DreamWorks. Jeffries suggested that the film was scrapped as both Sega and MGM wanted a higher share of the profits, while Densham said it followed creative differences between Sega and Trilogy.

In 2002, Ben Hurst consulted DIC Entertainment about the possibility of making an animated Sonic film to serve as a continuation of the animated Sonic the Hedgehog television series, in which he worked as a writer. DiC put Hurst in contact with a Sega executive interested in the idea. Hurst was contacted by Ken Penders, writer of the Archie Comics' Sonic the Hedgehog comic book series, who had been alerted of Hurst's plans. Though Hurst told him his strategy and offered to include him in his effort, Penders told Sega that Hurst was trying to co-opt the franchise, leading Sega to dismiss Hurst and his proposal. In September 2003, Penders pitched his own concept for a Sonic film, Sonic Armageddon. In Penders' words, the movie would have been an origin story and a series reset, resolving the plot threads which began in the animated Sonic show and continued in Archie's comic series. The project was dropped in 2007 due to a corporate upheaval and the death of Sega licensing manager Robert Leffler, who had supported Penders.

Development

In 2013, Sony Pictures Entertainment acquired the rights to produce and distribute a Sonic film. On June 10, 2014, a live-action animated film was announced as a joint venture between Sony Pictures' Columbia Pictures and Marza Animation Planet, a Japan-based subsidiary of Sega Sammy Holdings which had produced CGI cutscenes for several Sonic games. It would be produced by Neal H. Moritz by his Original Film banner alongside Takeshi Ito, Mie Onishi, and Toru Nakahara, and written by Evan Susser and Van Robichaux. In February 2016, Sega CEO Hajime Satomi said the film was scheduled for 2018. Blur Studio's Tim Miller and Jeff Fowler were hired in 2016 to develop it; Fowler would make his feature directorial debut, and Miller would serve as executive producer. Blur Studio previously produced cutscenes for the games Shadow the Hedgehog (2005), for which Fowler directed cutscenes, and Sonic the Hedgehog (2006). Patrick Casey, Josh Miller, and Oren Uziel were writing the screenplay, while Casey and Miller wrote the story.

On October 2, 2017, Paramount Pictures announced that they had acquired the rights after Sony put the film in turnaround. Almost all of the production team remained unchanged. Coincidentally, Paramount and Sega had once been sister companies under Gulf and Western Industries; Gulf and Western sold Sega's assets in 1984. In February 2018, it was announced that the film would be released in November 2019. During production the film used the working title "Casino Night", named after one of the stages in the Sonic games. Early drafts featured Sonic's Super Sonic form from the video games; the ideas were latterly discarded, as Fowler felt that "it didn't make sense to obviously bring in the Super Sonic thing just yet” and instead wanted to focus on the origins of Sonic and Robotnik's relationship.

Casting
In May 2018, it was reported that Paul Rudd was in talks for a lead role as Tom, "a cop who befriends Sonic and will likely team up to defeat Dr. Robotnik”; however, this was later denied by Paramount. A day later, it was announced that James Marsden was cast in an undisclosed role, but later revealed to be Tom Wachowski. In June, Tika Sumpter was cast as Tom's wife Maddie, with Jim Carrey cast to play the villain, Dr. Robotnik.

In August, Ben Schwartz joins the cast to voice Sonic. This marked a rare occasion in which the character would not be voiced by Roger Craig Smith, who voices Sonic in most incarnations since 2010. Schwartz, a fan of the original video games, was chosen for the role after Fowler and Miller cast him for a test reading as they pitched the project to several studios. Having enjoyed his performance, they officially cast Schwartz as the voice of Sonic. Adam Pally and Neal McDonough were added to the cast later that month. Debs Howard and Elfina Luk joined the cast the following November. Riff Raff was cast in an undisclosed role, but was cut from the film.

Filming
Principal photography began in mid-September 2018 and ended in Vancouver, Ladysmith, and Vancouver Island on October 16, 2018. Key production scenes were also filmed in Liwa Oasis, United Arab Emirates. During filming, Ben Schwartz was unavailable, so a stand-in performed alongside Marsden.

Visual effects and design
The visual effects are provided by Moving Picture Company (MPC), Marza Animation Planet, Blur Studio, Trixter, and Digital Domain. The production team created a live-action version of Sonic using CGI, adding fur, new running sneakers, two separate eyes, and a more human like physique. They used Ted, the living teddy bear from the Ted films, as a reference to insert a CGI character into a real-world setting. Executive producer Miller said: "It would be weird, and it would feel like he was running around nude if he was some sort of otter-like thing. It was always, for us, fur, and we never considered anything different. It's part of what integrates him into the real world and makes him a real creature." According to Miller, Sega was not "entirely happy" with the design of Sonic's eyes.

On May 2, 2019, in response to the criticism, Fowler announced on Twitter that Sonic would be redesigned. The film was delayed from its original release date of November 8, 2019, to February 14, 2020, as a result. Artist Tyson Hesse, who worked on previous Sonic the Hedgehog media, was brought on to lead the redesign. Sonic was given larger and differently colored eyes, new sneakers, white gloves, and a less humanlike body to better resemble Sonics video game design. Sonic was redesigned by Marza Animation Planet. The redesign added an estimated $5 million to the production budget, took around five months, and was achieved without overtime. 

A modified version of the original design for Sonic would later be included in the film Chip 'n Dale: Rescue Rangers (2022) as the character "Ugly Sonic", voiced by Tim Robinson.

Music

In February 2019, Tom Holkenborg, who previously worked with executive producer Miller on Deadpool, was hired to compose the score. The soundtrack was released alongside the film on February 14, 2020, in both digital and physical formats. Riff Raff, who had a role in the film but was cut due to controversy against him, appears on the soundtrack. An original song, "BOOM" by X Ambassadors, appears on the soundtrack, the single was released on January 24, 2020 by Atlantic Records. "Speed Me Up" by American musicians Wiz Khalifa, Lil Yachty, Ty Dolla $ign, and Sueco The Child  received 15million streams, along with 1.8billion views for the "Speed Me Up" TikTok challenge. "Friends" by Hyper Potions, which previously appeared as the opening theme of Sonic Mania, also appears, along with arrangements of tracks from Masato Nakamura's score for the original Sonic the Hedgehog (1991). Holkenborg attempted to capture the feel of Nakamura's soundtracks for the Sonic and Sonic the Hedgehog 2 (1992) games, using Yamaha digital FM synthesizers (such as the DX7) similar to the Sega Genesis/Mega Drive console's Yamaha YM2612 sound chip.

Release

Marketing

Test footage was screened at the Comic Con Experience in Brazil on December 6, 2018. It was followed by a teaser poster released on December 10, 2018, revealing the silhouette design of Sonic, with the tagline "A Whole New Speed of Hero". It received a negative response from critics and fans, and was compared unfavorably to another 2019 video game film adaptation, Detective Pikachu, which added fur and skin textures to the Pokémon characters. Sonic's humanoid appearance was described as evoking an uncanny valley response. Former members of Sonic Team, who created the Sonic the Hedgehog games, also expressed surprise. A second poster was leaked online shortly after. Fans complained of a lack of resemblance to the games and criticized the positioning of Sonic's legs, spawning an Internet meme in which users recreated the position. The film's official Twitter account posted an image of Sonic behind a sign reading: "Can't a guy work out?" Images of the Sonic design were leaked in March 2019 to more fan criticism. Sonic co-creator Yuji Naka was "shocked" by the design and felt the ratio of Sonic's head and abdomen was imbalanced.

The first trailer premiered on April 4, 2019, at CinemaCon in Las Vegas, and was released online on April 30. It received near-unanimous criticism, with Gita Jackson of Kotaku calling it "horrific" and "a blight upon this weary earth". Sonic's design was heavily criticized by fans for its humanoid appearance, while some found the use of Coolio's "Gangsta's Paradise" jarring. Conversely, CNET'''s Sean Keane praised the humor and references to the games. Within two days, the trailer was viewed more than 20million times on YouTube, and had received hundreds of thousands of "dislike" ratings, drastically outnumbering the "like" ratings.

A second trailer revealing the redesigned Sonic was released on November 12, 2019. The trailer received far more positive responses, with many praising Sonic's new design. The tone and the humor also received positive reviews, as did the choice of song, J. J. Fad's "Supersonic" and Ramones' "Blitzkrieg Bop". Naka said he felt the new design was "much more Sonic-like". The second trailer received thousands of likes and the highest like-to-dislike ratio of any trailer on Google in the last three years. The trailers have garnered a total of more than 500million views worldwide. As a promotional tie-in, the version of Sonic seen in the film was added as a playable character to the mobile games Sonic Dash and Sonic Forces. 

The original design, named "Ugly Sonic", appears as a minor character in the 2022 film Chip 'n Dale: Rescue Rangers, playing off the Internet's reaction to the first trailer. According to that film's director Akiva Schaffer, they had also used Moving Picture Company for their animation studio, and MPC was able to provide the original Sonic model for the film. The character was voiced in the film by comedian Tim Robinson.

TheatricalSonic the Hedgehog was scheduled for 2018 by Sony Pictures Releasing. In February 2018, shortly after taking over the rights, Paramount Pictures rescheduled the film to November 15, 2019. It was later moved a week earlier to November 8, 2019. Following the announcement of Sonic's redesign in May 2019, the film was delayed for the final time by three months, to February 14, 2020; this was to provide enough time for the redesign to be completed. Playing with Fire took the original release date. The world premiere took place at the Paramount Theatre in Los Angeles on January 25, 2020. The film was originally going to be released in Japan on March 27, 2020, but had to be moved to June 26, 2020, due to the COVID-19 pandemic.

Home media
On March 20, 2020, Paramount announced that Sonic the Hedgehog would be released to home media in the United States and Canada before the end of the usual 90-day theatrical run, as many film studios took the decision to release films earlier due to movie theaters closures in mid-March because of the COVID-19 pandemic restrictions. The digital version was released on March 31, 2020, and was released on DVD, Blu-ray, and Ultra HD Blu-ray by Paramount Home Entertainment on May 19, 2020. All home media releases include an original short film, Around the World in 80 Seconds.

The film topped the American Blu-ray and DVD charts for several weeks upon release. It was the sixth top-selling home video title of 2020 in the United States.

After its release to Digital HD in 2020, Paramount Pictures announced that the film would land on the streaming service, EPIX on November 20, 2020. The movie then made its move to streaming service, Hulu on February 18, 2021, and on Amazon Prime Video the next day on February 19, 2021. Paramount Pictures also confirmed that the movie as well as its sequel entitled Sonic the Hedgehog 2 would release later on Paramount+ with its sequel being released 45 days after its theatrical release window.

Reception
It was the sixth-highest-grossing film of 2020, and the highest-grossing superhero film of the year, ending Marvel Studios decade-long run of having the highest-grossing film of the genre (from 2010 to 2019). The film's budget was estimated at being between $85 million and $90 million.

In the United States and Canada, the film was released alongside Fantasy Island, The Photograph, and Downhill, and was initially projected to gross $40–50 million from 4,130 theaters in its four-day President's Day opening weekend. After making $21 million on its first day (including $3 million from Thursday night previews), estimates were raised to $64 million. It went on to top the box office with a $58 million debut over the three-day weekend, and $70 million over the four, breaking Detective Pikachus record for the biggest opening weekend by a video game-based film. It was also the fourth-best President's Day holiday weekend and Jim Carrey's second biggest opening weekend, behind Bruce Almighty (2003). The success was attributed in part to the redesign of Sonic and the publicity it created, and the delayed release date, which meant it opened with less competition from other family films. Opening day audiences were 56% male and 44% female, with 70% under 25 years and 30% over 25 years. Sonic the Hedgehog made $16.3 million in its third weekend and was dethroned by newcomer The Invisible Man. Its largest international markets in its first ten days were the United Kingdom, Mexico, and France, retaining the top spot in these markets. The film opened in 16 new markets, led by a number-one debut in Russia. The film was released in Japan on June 26, 2020, after being postponed from a previous March release due to the COVID-19 pandemic, and debuted at No. 6 that weekend. In China, the release was also postponed due to the pandemic, eventually receiving a July 31 date and underperforming at the Chinese box office due to new pandemic-related theatre policies there.

In terms of box office admissions, the film sold 15,876,790 tickets in the United States and Canada (annual rank #3), 6,811,679 tickets in Mexico (annual #1), 893,634 tickets in Peru (annual #2), 468,697 tickets in Ecuador (annual #1), 67,230 tickets in the Dominican Republic (annual #2), 12,454,206 tickets in Europe (annual #3), 3,001,403 tickets in Brazil (annual #3), 698,500 tickets in China, 687,740 tickets in Argentina (annual #3), and 118,725 tickets in South Korea, for a combined  tickets sold in these territories.

Critical response
The website's critics consensus reads: "Fittingly fleet and frequently fun, Sonic the Hedgehog is a video game-inspired adventure the whole family can enjoy -- and a fine excuse for Jim Carrey to tap into the manic energy that launched his career." On Metacritic, the film has a weighted average score of 47 out of 100, based on 42 critics, indicating "mixed or average reviews". Audiences polled by CinemaScore gave the film an average grade of "A" on an A+ to F scale, and PostTrak reported it received an average 4 out of 5 stars, with 66% of viewers they surveyed saying they would definitely recommend it.

Akeem Lawanson of IGN gave the film a score of 7 out of 10, praising the performances and the nostalgia, stating, "While this family-friendly action-comedy suffers from a simplistic story and leans too heavily on tired visual clichés, Sonic the Hedgehog is nevertheless boosted by solid performances from Ben Schwartz as Sonic and Jim Carrey as Dr. Robotnik. Their ongoing cat-and-mouse game is entertaining, and passionate fans of the Sega franchise should appreciate all the nods to Sonic's history." Dami Lee of The Verge gave the film a positive review, praising the nostalgic elements seen in the film, writing that it "shines when it remembers it's based on a video game, and there's some genuinely fun stuff—like when Sonic uses his time-stopping powers or Robotnik's elaborate 'evil-plotting' montage that makes you wonder why more movies don't feature bad guys with choreographed dance sequences. Carrey plays up Robotnik as the cartoon villain he is, and it's a true delight to watch him in his element." Corey Plante of Inverse called it a "road trip superhero movie" and "the best superhero movie of 2020" so far. John DeFore of The Hollywood Reporter, gave the film a positive review, saying: "Flesh-and-blood actors help keep this game derived kids' flick afloat."

Gene Park of The Washington Post gave the film a positive review, saying it was "the furthest thing from Cats, despite the early comparisons. Wary fans expecting the usual easy target to mock will instead find something to fervently celebrate for years." Amon Warrman of Empire gave the film two out of five stars, writing, "An on-form Jim Carrey can't stop Sonic's live-action debut from feeling like a missed opportunity. If the teased sequels do materialize, here's hoping the storytelling levels up." Ben Kenigsberg of The New York Times gave the film a negative review and wrote, "Sonic now resembles a cartoon hedgehog instead of a spray-painted marmot. But if anything was done to de-genericize the script, it hasn't helped. Not that the Sega games—in which the fleet-footed hero zips around doing flips and collecting gold coins (which here encircle the Paramount mountain) gave the director, Jeff Fowler, much to work with."Varietys Owen Gleiberman criticized the tone: "For all the borderline tedium I felt at Sonic the Hedgehog, I do realize that this is a picture made for 8-year-olds. And they'll probably like it just fine. Yet I would also call the overly kiddified tone of the movie a mistake." Writing for The Guardian, Steve Rose gave the film two out of five, saying elements were "clearly indebted" to other films, such as Quicksilver's powers in the X-Men movies, and finding the message of friendship "trite and familiar". Simon Abrams of RogerEbert.com gave the film one out of four, writing, "Sonic the Hedgehog is only as successful as the amount of time you want to spend watching its animated protagonist go on instantly forgettable adventures, and boy, is that unfortunate." Tim Grierson of Screen Daily also gave the film a negative review, writing, "The film projects enough benign cheerfulness that the experience is never unpleasant, but one can’t help but feel the filmmakers’ strain in crafting a sly action-comedy for audiences expecting over-the-top spectacle and nonstop quips. Sadly, Sonic isn’t swift enough to deliver."

Accolades

Other media
Novelization
A chapter novel based on the film, titled Sonic the Hedgehog: The Official Movie Novelization, written by Kiel Phegley and published by Penguin Books, was released alongside the film on February 14, 2020. 

Sequels

Paramount confirmed that a sequel was in development on May 28, 2020. Fowler returned as director, while Casey and Josh Miller returned as writers. Neal H. Mortiz, Toby Ascher, and Toru Nakahara produced the sequel, having co-produced the first film alongside Takeshi Ito, while Tim Miller, Hajime Satomi, and Haruki Satomi returned as executive producers. Filming took place between March 2021 and May 2021, under the working title Emerald Hill. This was a reference to "Emerald Hill Zone", the first level of the game Sonic the Hedgehog 2 (1992); in addition, the film's title announcement trailer features a remix of the level's music.

On December 8, 2020, it was confirmed that artist Tyson Hesse would reprise his role for storyboard artist Fill Marc as he said the following: "I wrapped up work on Lower Decks Season 2 last week. Excited 2 announce I've been working on the Sonic the Hedgehog 2 Story Team with Jeff Fowler and Tyson Hesse at Blur Studio. My first live action feature coming in 2022." This will be Marc's first live-action project. In January 2021, Sumpter announced that she was reprising her role as Maddie. She also announced that the sequel would film in Vancouver and Hawaii. The film's title, Sonic the Hedgehog 2, was confirmed on February 10, 2021. On March 15, 2021, Jeff Fowler confirmed that production of the film had begun. The film was released on March 30, 2022 in France and the Netherlands, April 1 in the U.K. and on April 8 in the U.S. 

In February 2022, a third film was confirmed to be in development, scheduled for release on December 20, 2024.

Television series
In February 2022, a spin-off series starring Knuckles the Echidna was announced, scheduled for release on Paramount+ in 2023 with Idris Elba reprising his role as the character.

See also
 List of films based on video games

Notes

References

External links

 
 
 Sonic the Hedgehog'' at the TCM Movie Database
 

2020 action comedy films
2020 computer-animated films
2020 films
2020 science fiction action films
2020 action adventure films
2020s American animated films
2020s animated superhero films
2020s buddy comedy films
2020s English-language films
2020s fantasy adventure films
2020s superhero comedy films
American action adventure films
American animated superhero films
American computer-animated films
American fantasy adventure films
American fantasy films
American robot films
American science fiction action films
American superhero films
Advertising and marketing controversies in film
Blur Studio films
Comedy road movies
English-language Japanese films
Films about hedgehogs
Films directed by Jeff Fowler
Films produced by Neal H. Moritz
Films scored by Junkie XL
Films set in California
Films set in Montana
Films set in San Francisco
Films set in Virginia
Films set on fictional planets
Films shot in Vancouver
American films with live action and animation
Films with screenplays by Josh Miller (filmmaker)
Films with screenplays by Patrick Casey (writer)
Japanese action adventure films
Japanese computer-animated films
Japanese fantasy adventure films
Japanese fantasy films
Japanese science fiction action films
Live-action films based on video games
Mad scientist films
Film and television memes
Films using motion capture
Internet memes introduced in 2019
Original Film films
Paramount Pictures animated films
Paramount Pictures films
Sonic the Hedgehog films